Wilson Sea with English name Wilson Sea, is Chinese entrepreneur and educator. He serves as chairman and executive director of China First Capital Group Limited and used to be the president and chairman of Minsheng Securities Co., Ltd. On September 19, 2019, he was elected as a member of University of Oxford Principal's Trust Council (CCB).

experiences 
From 1997 to 2004, Wilson Sea served as Executive Assistant, President and Chairman of Minsheng Securities Co., Ltd., and was in charge of the business planning and development of the investment bank operation and research department.

From 2007 to 2011, he was appointed as Vice Chairman of the Board of Directors of North Henan (Xinxiang) Automobile Power Steering Gear Co., Ltd. On November 23, 2011, China Vehicle Components Technology Holdings Co., Ltd. was successfully listed on the Hong Kong Stock Exchange. On January 1, 2015, he was transferred to the chairman and executive director of China First Capital Group Limited.

Publication of books 
 《西方国有经济研究》 (1980)  
 《企业兼并研究》 (1999)

Papers and Publications 
1996, On Institutional Arrangement of Industry, Academic Journal of Henan University: Social Science Edition

1996, On Several Erroneous Zone of State-owned Enterprise Reform, Economic Reform

1996, Wilson Sea and Qi Guoqi, On Enterprise Trusteeship Management, Economic Forum

1995, Get Out of the State-owned Enterprise Reform's Erroneous Zone, Economic Forum

1995, Industrial Orientation and Adjustment Thinking of Chinese State-owned Economy, Economic Review

1995, On the Scale and Change Path of State-Owned Economy, Economic System Reform

1995, Industrial Orientation and Adjustment Thinking of Chinese State-owned Economy, Economic Review

1995, Institutional Industrial Arrangement and Industrial Characteristics of State-owned Economy, Nankai Economic Studies

1988, Zhang Yuxiang and Wilson Sea, Sorting out Property Relationship as the Breakthrough of Urban Collective Ownership Enterprise Reform, Economic Review

Notes

References

Businesspeople
Chinese business executives